Brentwood railway station is on the Great Eastern Main Line in the East of England, serving the town of Brentwood, Essex. It is  down the line from London Liverpool Street and is situated between Harold Wood and Shenfield. Its three-letter station code is BRE.

History

Eastern Counties Railways (1840–1862)
Brentwood station was opened on 1 July 1840 as a temporary terminus by the Eastern Counties Railway (ECR) on what was to become the Great Eastern Main Line, until 1843, when the line was extended towards . From opening, a small railway turntable was provided and by 1845 as the size of locomotives grew a larger turntable was provided. As it is located at the bottom of a steep incline locomotives were allocated at Brentwood to assist trains get up the bank and by 1868 the turntable was enlarged. A three-track engine shed located at the London-end of the station behind the then London-bound platform of the two-platform station.

Initially provided with temporary wooden buildings, substantial brick buildings were provided on the London side in 1842. These included a tower and a bell sounded when trains departed.

A north-facing siding behind the London-bound platform was provided for traffic to the nearby Warley Barracks.

By the 1860s the railways in East Anglia were in financial trouble, and most were leased to the ECR; they wished to amalgamate formally, but could not obtain government agreement for this until 1862, when the Great Eastern Railway was formed by amalgamation.

Great Eastern Railway (1862–1922)
The Great Eastern Railway (GER) took over operation in 1862 and renamed the station "Brentwood & Warley for Billericay" in 1882, shortened to "Brentwood & Warley" in 1889.

By the 1870s the goods yard which was located on the country side of the line south of the station contained a number of loops and sidings. As well as serving a goods shed, spurs served a local gas works and Robsons Maltings. By the 1890s a coal siding operated by East Anglian coal merchant Thomas Moy was in operation.

The engine shed was rebuilt in 1893.

London & North Eastern Railway (1923–1947)
After the grouping of 1923 operation of the station passed to the London and North Eastern Railway (LNER). The LNER doubled the number of tracks passing through to four, from 1934. Two new platforms were opened on the south side of the station, with a new booking office.

The bell tower was demolished during the 1920s.

Plans to electrify the line through Brentwood to Shenfield were announced during the 1930s but put on hold after World War II broke out. The station was bombed during World War II and the new booking office was damaged.

World War II saw an increase of engines allocated to Brentwood engine shed, possibly re-sited away from the larger and more obvious target at Stratford.

British Railways (1948–1996)
After nationalisation on 1 January 1948 Brentwood became part of the Eastern Region of British Railways.

The engine shed was closed in 1949 although the goods yard had a small petrol shunter that was maintained locally, being withdrawn in September 1956.

The electric service to Shenfield was inaugurated on 26 September 1949 but services were run to steam timings with a number of steam trains still operating. The full electric service officially commenced on 7 November 1949 (although a full dummy run had taken place the previous day).

In 1969 the station's name was changed back to "Brentwood".

Privatisation era (1996–present)

The station is sited at the bottom of a bank which ascends to the east towards Shenfield. This presented a significant climb to down-steam trains. Until 2001, embankment ladders were present to allow workmen to access the tracks but these were replaced with a walkway along the tracks.

In 2010, National Express East Anglia, then the operating company for the line, commenced an improvement programme at the station, including the expansion of the entrance and ticket hall, refurbishment of waiting rooms and provision for the installation of customer lifts to the platforms.

In May 2015, the Shenfield stopping service was taken over by TfL Rail, and subsequently became part of the Elizabeth line in May 2022.

Accidents and incidents
On 19 September 1850, nine workmen were killed when they were struck by a train near Brentwood station in dense fog. The ECR was criticised by the coroner's jury for not adequately protecting the men.
On 20 November 1902, approximately 80 passengers were injured on an -Liverpool Street service that had stopped at Brentwood & Warley station when it was rear-ended by a train that was not in service. A Board of Trade report stated that the empty train's speed "was not more than four or five miles an hour" at the time of the collision as it had only just pulled out of a siding to enter service from Brentwood.
On 8 July 1926, 12 people were injured when a passenger and mail train from Liverpool Street was approaching Brentwood & Warley and collided head-on with a train pilot engine. At the moment of impact the speed of the passenger train had been about 10 mph, whilst the light engine was almost or completely stationary. The primary causes of the accident were recorded as driver and shunter errors, as well as excessive speed.
An express train travelling from Liverpool Street to Norwich Thorpe came to a stand on the main line, unable to ascend the bank due to a shortage of steam, and about eight minutes later was run into from the rear by a -bound stopping service which had passed a signal at danger. The speed of the Southend train was reported to have been around 30 mph, resulting in a violent collision. The driver of the Southend train was fully fit, highly experienced and should have noticed both the red signal and the stopped train ahead. He "fully admitted his responsibility for the collision" and according to a Ministry of War Transport investigation: "Such a grave lapse on the part of an experienced main line driver is difficult to explain."

Services

The following services typically call at Brentwood:

References

External links

 Excel file displaying National Rail station usage information for 2005/06 

Railway stations in Essex
Transport in the Borough of Brentwood
Former Great Eastern Railway stations
Railway stations served by the Elizabeth line
Railway stations in Great Britain opened in 1840